Sidneioides is a genus of colonial sea squirts, tunicates in the family Polyclinidae.

Species
The World Register of Marine Species lists the following species:
Sidneioides ivicense Pérès, 1957
Sidneioides japonense Redikorzev, 1913
Sidneioides peregrinus Kremer et al., 2011
Sidneioides snamoti (Oka, 1927)
Sidneioides tamaramae Kesteven, 1909

References

Enterogona
Tunicate genera